, also romanized as Mayekawa, was a Japanese businessman, central banker, the 24th Governor of the Bank of Japan (BOJ).

Early life
Maekawa was born in Tokyo.

Career
Before rising to become head of the Bank of Japan, Maekawa held other bank positions, including director of foreign-exchange operations.

Maekawa was Governor of the Bank of Japan from December 17, 1979 through December 16, 1984, having previously served as Deputy Governor from 1974 to 1979.  Along with Finance Minister Noboru Takeshita, he was credited with negotiating a Saudi-Japan petrodollar accord in 1980.

Maekawa Commission 

In 1986, the Maekawa Commission (the "Advisory Group on Economic Restructuring" headed by Maekawa) proposed economic reforms designed to make the living standards of Japanese more comparable to levels enjoyed in the West. Maekawa is credited as the chief author of the commission report. Maekawa Report into effect. His two reports argued that Japan should seek switch from an export-oriented economy into a domestic demand-led economy. They downplayed the need for achieving economic parity  using foreign exchange rate adjustments. A new reorientation would require more spending and less saving.  There would have to be demand-side improvements in the quality of daily life, changes in Japan's industrial structure and more imports. It proposed industrial structural transformations using market-incentive mechanisms.  however the report was merely a statement of long-term goals, and contain no meaningful action programs. Even so it was  opposed by many Liberal Democrats, by angry interest groups, and a few prominent economists. The report had very little long-term impact.

See also
 Plaza Accord

Notes

Further reading 
 Higashi, Chikara, and G. Peter Lauter. "The Maekawa Commission Reports and the Potential Constraints on Internationalization." in The Internationalization of the Japanese Economy (Springer, Dordrecht, 1990) pp. 121-179.
 Maekawa, Haruo. Maekawa Report (The Report of the Advisory Group on Economic Restructuring).  ( Rotterdam Institute of Modern Asia Studies (RIMAS) 1987). OCLC 150137623
 Moore, James P. "The United States and Japan: Competition and cooperation." (1988). Online
 Werner, Richard A. (2003). Princes of the Yen: Japan's Central Bankers and the Transformation of the Economy. Armonk, New York: M.E. Sharpe. ;  OCLC 471605161

1911 births
1989 deaths
Governors of the Bank of Japan